Karl Leavitt "Barney" Thielscher Sr. (April 24, 1895 – May 5, 1990) was an American football fullback who played one season in the American Professional Football Association (APFA) for the Buffalo All-Americans. He played college football at Dartmouth

Early life and military career

Karl Thielscher was born on April 24, 1895, in Brookline, Massachusetts. He attended Brookline High School, being a team captain, before going to Dartmouth College, where he was an "outstanding player" in both football and baseball. He graduated in 1917, before being drafted to serve in World War I.

In July 1917 The Boston Globe reported him as in the Watertown Arsenal, writing, "Karl Thielscher, the old Brookline High, Tedesco Club and Dartmouth College infielder, is now located at the Watertown Arsenal. He will have his Saturday afternoons off until he is sent to France and is rather anxious to keep in good trim by playing with some strong semi-professional teams." 

Thielscher was later transferred from the ordnance department of the army to the Aviation Corps and was given several months furlough, returning to his alma mater as an assistant coach. After returning to the Aviation Corps, Thielscher was given the rank of lieutenant.

In June 1918, Thielscher briefly played third base for the St. Patrick's Catholic Club baseball team. In a game against Camp Holabird, he was described as the "batting star" by The Baltimore Sun. The paper wrote:

In 1919, Thielscher, a first lieutenant, served as an officer for Camp Robinson.

Professional career
He appeared in two official games against non-league opponents. He was starting fullback in his first appearance, a 51–0 victory over All-Buffalo. The Buffalo Enquirer reported, "The Buffalo professional football team that has been assembled by Frank McNeill yesterday again demonstrated its exceptional skill by easily defeating the All-Buffalos by the score of 51 to 0. The All-Buffalos were outclassed in every department of the game by the former college stars now known as the All-American eleven of this city." A fair catch called for by Thielscher that was interfered with drew a 15-yard penalty, which led to a field goal by Heinie Miller. The Buffalo Evening News mentioned that he was replaced by Charlie Mills before later coming back as a substitute for Ockie Anderson; Anderson later returned to the game, and Thielscher replaced Mills.

Thielscher made one other appearance during the 1920 APFA season, coming in late as a substitute for Andy Fletcher during a game against the Toledo Maroons. The Buffalo Enquirer on October 25, reported, "Buffalo's professional football eleven yesterday afternoon again demonstrated its wonderful strength and gridiron abilities when it soundly defeated the widely touted Toledo Maroons by the score of 38 to 0. There never was a time when the local eleven was in real danger, although the Maroons were not to be held too lightly as a football machine. It was only the remarkable individual plays of the Buffalo boys that accounted for the victory."

Later life and death
Thielscher did not return to the team after their victory over the Maroons, and became a referee, officiating games less than a month later. After APFA official Eugene W. Garson was severely injured in a Buffalo All-Americans game, Thielscher was named as a replacement at the umpire position. He officiated their game against the Columbus Panhandles, a 38–0 win for the All-Americans.

In 1923, Thielscher returned to his alma mater of Dartmouth College to assist the coaching staff.

Thielscher married Adele Duhrssen on September 20, 1928, at the Madison Avenue Presbyterian Church in New York City. The couple had two sons, Karl Jr., and David, both of which played college football at Dartmouth College.

He worked for the Graybar Company, an electrical supply distributor, and served multiple roles until his retirement in 1957. He later moved to Palm Beach, Florida, where he died in 1990 at the age of 95.

Notes

References

1895 births
1990 deaths
American football fullbacks
Dartmouth Big Green baseball players
Dartmouth Big Green football players
Buffalo All-Americans players
Sportspeople from Brookline, Massachusetts
Players of American football from Massachusetts
Baseball players from Massachusetts